Marivivens donghaensis is a Gram-negative and aerobic bacterium from the genus of Marivivens which has been isolated from seawater from the Sea of Japan in Korea.

References

External links
Type strain of Marivivens donghaensis at BacDive -  the Bacterial Diversity Metadatabase

Rhodobacteraceae
Bacteria described in 2015